The Diocese of Basel is a Catholic diocese in Switzerland.

Historically, the bishops of Basel were also secular rulers of the Prince-Bishopric of Basel .

The bishop of Basel has not resided in the city of Basel since 1528. Solothurn is the seat of the Bishop of Basel.

Today the diocese of Basel includes the Swiss cantons of Aargau, Basel-Country, Basel-City, Berne, Jura, Lucerne, Schaffhausen, Solothurn, Thurgau, and Zug.

Ordinaries

Jakob Christoph Blarer von Wartensee (1576–1608)
Wilhelm Rinck von Balderstein  (1609–1628)
Johann Heinrich von Ostein (1629–1646)
Beat Albrecht von Ramstein (1646–1651)
Johann Franz Reichsritter von Schönau (1651–1656)
Johann Konrad von Roggenbach (1657–1693)
Wilhelm Jakob Rink von Baldenstein (1693–1705)
Johann Konrad Reichsfreiherr von Reinach-Hirzbach (1705–1737)
Jakob Sigismund von Reinach-Steinbrunn (1737–1743)
Josef Wilhelm Rinck von Baldenstein (1744–1762)
Simon Nikolaus Euseb Reichsgraf von Montjoye-Hirsingen (1762–1775)
Friedrich Ludwig Franz Reichsfreiherr von Wangen zu Geroldseck (1775–1782)
Franz Joseph Sigismund von Roggenbach (1782–1792)
Franz Xaver Freiherr von Neveu (1792–1828)
Josef Anton Salzmann (1828–1854)
Karl Arnold-Obrist (1854–1862)
Eugène Lachat C.Pp.S.  (1863–1884)
Friedrich Xaver Odo Fiala (1885–1888)
Leonhard Haas (1888–1906)
Jakobus von Stammler (1906–1925)
Joseph Ambühl (1925–1936)
Franz von Streng (1936–1967)
Anton Hänggi (1967–1982)
Otto Wüst (1982–1993)
Hansjörg Vogel (1994–1995)
Kurt Koch (1995–2010)
Felix Gmür (2010– )
For a list of bishops prior to 1583, see: List of Bishops of Basel

External links
Bistum Basel 

History of Christianity in Switzerland
Bishops of Basel
Roman Catholic dioceses in Switzerland
Upper Rhenish Circle
Diocese (Roman Catholic)